Micromonospora trujilloniae is a Gram-positive bacterium from the genus Micromonospora which has been isolated from mangrove soil in Wenchang, Hainan, China.

References

External links
Type strain of Verrucosispora wenchangensis at BacDive -  the Bacterial Diversity Metadatabase	

Micromonosporaceae
Bacteria described in 2012